This is a list of the top-selling albums in New Zealand for 2013 from the Official New Zealand Music Chart's end-of-year chart, compiled by Recorded Music NZ.  Twelve of the albums were of New Zealand origin. The top album, Sol3 Mio by Sol3 Mio, was released just five weeks before the chart was compiled.

Chart 

Key
 – Album of New Zealand origin

References

External links 
 The Official NZ Music Chart - albums

2013 in New Zealand music
2013 record charts
Albums 2013